DeHaven or De Haven is a surname. Notable people with the surname include:

Bruce DeHaven (1948–2016), American football coach
Carter DeHaven (1886–1977), American actor
Edwin De Haven (1816–1865), United States Navy officer and explorer
Flora Parker DeHaven (1883–1950), American actress
Gloria DeHaven (1925–2016), American actress
Hugh De Haven (1895–1980), American pilot, engineer and passive safety pioneer
John J. De Haven (1849–1913), U.S. Representative from California
Penny DeHaven (1948–2014), American country music singer
Tom De Haven (born 1949), American writer